WGHL (105.1 FM) is a commercial radio station located in Shepherdsville, Kentucky, broadcasting to the Louisville, Kentucky area.  The station's studios are located in downtown Louisville and the transmitter site is in Jefferson Memorial Forest on the southern edge of Louisville/Jefferson County proper. WGHL is owned by Alpha Media.

History
105.1 FM signed on in 1992 as Hot AC-formatted WEHR. It flipped to Christian music as WXLN in June 1996. In February 2000, the station flipped to active rock as "LRS 105", WLRS. Those call letters were formerly found on 102.3 FM from 1964 until 1999. (For more on the history of the original WLRS, see WXMA.) On July 15, 2009, WLRS changed formats to "FM TALK" and featured the Mancow radio show in the morning.

On November 1, 2012, WLRS dropped its talk format and began stunting with Christmas music, and branded as "Christmas 105.1". On Christmas Eve 2012, WLRS flipped to "Easy Rock 105.1" with a soft AC/oldies format. On January 30, 2013, WLRS changed their call letters to WESI, to go with the "Easy Rock 105.1" branding.

On October 13, 2014, WESI flipped to classic hits as The New 105.1 GHL-FM, Louisville's Greatest Hits. The call letters were changed to WGHL on October 16, 2014.

On January 30, 2015, WGHL changed formats to classic hip hop, branded as "Old School 105.1". On September 6, 2016, WGHL rebranded as "G105.1".

On August 31, 2018, WGHL changed formats to alternative rock, branded as "Alt 105.1".

Previous logos

References

External links
Official Website

ESI
Radio stations established in 1993
Alpha Media radio stations
Alternative rock radio stations in the United States
1993 establishments in Kentucky
Bullitt County, Kentucky